The Producers Guild of America Award for Outstanding Producer of Non-Fiction Television, previously called Outstanding Producer of Reality/Game/Informational Series Television (2002–2003), is an annual award given by the Producers Guild of America since 2002.

Winners and nominees

2000s

2010s

2020s

Total awards by network

 CBS – 5
 CNN – 3
 A&E – 2
 HBO – 2
 PBS – 2
 BBC One – 1
 Bravo – 1
 Discovery Channel – 1
 Disney+ – 1
 ESPN - 1
 Fox – 1
 Nat Geo – 1
 Netflix – 1

Programs with multiple awards
4 awards
 60 Minutes (2 consecutive)
2 awards
 American Masters (consecutive)
 Anthony Bourdain: Parts Unknown

Programs with multiple nominations

11 nominations
 60 Minutes

9 nominations
 30 for 30

6 nominations
 Anthony Bourdain: Parts Unknown
 Deadliest Catch

5 nominations
 The Amazing Race

4 nominations
 Kathy Griffin: My Life on the D-List
 Shark Tank

3 nominations
 American Idol
 American Masters
 Anthony Bourdain: No Reservations
 Extreme Makeover: Home Edition
 Queer Eye
 Inside the Actors Studio
 Undercover Boss

2 nominations
 Biography
 Frontline
 Intervention
 Leah Remini: Scientology and the Aftermath
 Project Greenlight
 Queer Eye for the Straight Guy
 Stanley Tucci: Searching for Italy
 This American Life

References

Non-Fiction TV
Awards established in 2002